Fence Riders is a 1950 American Western film directed by Wallace Fox and written by Eliot Gibbons. The film stars Whip Wilson, Andy Clyde, Reno Browne, Riley Hill, Myron Healey and Ed Cassidy. The film was released on January 19, 1950, by Monogram Pictures.

Plot

Cast              
Whip Wilson as Whip Wilson
Andy Clyde as Winks McGee
Reno Browne as Jean Martin
Riley Hill as Hutch Cramer
Myron Healey as Cameo Krogan
Ed Cassidy as Sheriff Tracy
Terry Frost as Deputy
Frank McCarroll as Pete 
George DeNormand as Joe 
Mike Ragan as Gus Rayburn 
John Merton as Slater
Buck Bailey as Ted

References

External links
 

1950 films
American Western (genre) films
1950 Western (genre) films
Monogram Pictures films
Films directed by Wallace Fox
American black-and-white films
1950s English-language films
1950s American films